Meditation Attitude (Buddhism) (Khmer: ព្រះពុទ្ធសម្មាធិ, preah pud (buddha) samathi,), also known as meditating Buddha, is an attitude of Buddha in Thai, Burmese, Khmer, Lao, and other Buddhist countries' art, of which the seated Buddha rests both upturned hands on his lap, the right hand usually on top. His eyes are closed. The attitude refers to an episode where he reached enlightenment, meditating in this posture under the Bodhi tree. Other names in Thai are "reaching enlightenment attitude" (ปางตรัสรู้; paang trassaruu) or the "first attitude" (ปฐมปาง; pathom paang). The attitude has another version called "Diamond Mediation attitude" (ปางขัดสมาธิเพชร; paang kud sa ma thi petch), in which the position of his feet differs from this one.

Not to be confused with the other common seated Buddha called maravijaya attitude, the meditation attitude has both hands on his lap, whilst the maravijaya has only one hand on the lap.

Gallery

References 

Thai Buddha Attitudes translations
translated from :th:ปางสมาธิ on Thai Wikipedia

Buddhist art
Buddhist iconography
Laotian art
Thai Buddhist art and architecture
Buddhism in Laos
Cultural depictions of Gautama Buddha